David W. Augsburger is an American Anabaptist author with a Ph.D. from Claremont School of Theology and a BA and BD from Eastern Mennonite College and Eastern Mennonite Seminary respectively.

He is one of six children, Fred, Donald, Anna Mary, Daniel and Myron, born to Clarence and Estella Augsburger. His brother Myron is a prominent Mennonite Church author, evangelist, and theologian.

Augsburger writes on Christian subjects and joined the School of Theology at Fuller Theological Seminary in 1990 as the Professor of Pastoral Care and Counseling. Augsburger is a minister of the Mennonite and a diplomate of the American Association of Pastoral Counselors. Although all of Augsburger's works revolve around the subject of Christianity, some also cover dealing with hatred, prejudice, and violence, as well as being a forgiving person.

Works
 Caring Enough to Confront:How to Understand and Express Your Deepest Feelings Toward Others
 The Freedom of Forgiveness 
 Caring Enough to Forgive—Caring Enough Not to Forgive 
 Caring Enough to Hear and Be Heard: How to Hear and How to Be Heard in Equal Communication
 Dissident Discipleship: A Spirituality of Self-Surrender, Love of God, and Love of Neighbor (2006)
 Pastoral Counseling Across Cultures 
 When Caring Is Not Enough: Resolving Conflicts Through Fair Fighting
 Helping People Forgive
 When Enough Is Enough (Caring Enough)
 The Freedom of Forgiveness (Revised and Expanded) 1988 
 Anger and Assertiveness in Pastoral Care (Creative Pastoral Care and Counseling Series)
 The New Freedom of Forgiveness, Moody Publishing, 2010. 
 Be all you can be
 Cherishable: love and marriage 
 Hate-Work: Working Through the Pain and Pleasures of Hate 
 Communicating good news
 Caring Enough to Forgive—Caring Enough Not to Forgive 
 Man uptight! 
 How dare you be a pessimist!
 So What? Everybody's Doing it
 Everybody's not doing it (Pamphlet)
 Sustaining Love: Healing & Growth in the Passages of Marriage 
 Man, am I uptight! 
 Life or limbo
 Beyond assertiveness 
 Christmas: The Annual of Christmas Literature and Art, 1990 
 A risk worth taking
 Witness is Withness: More Showing Than Telling 
 Wieso? Das tun doch alle! ( Taschenbuch )
 From Here to Maturity 
 Sustaining Love
 Differencias Personales? Enfrentelas Con Amor: Caring Enough to Confront

References

External links
Complete Bibliography
Comprehensive Biography 

Mennonite ministers
Mennonite theologians
Year of birth missing (living people)
Living people
American Mennonites
Christian radicals
Fuller Theological Seminary faculty
Eastern Mennonite University alumni
20th-century Anabaptist ministers
Mennonite writers